Joan Lino Martínez Armenteros (born January 11, 1978 in Havana, Cuba) is a Spanish athlete. He competes in the long jump.


Career
Martínez was born to a Cuban father and Spanish mother. After his switch from Cuba to Spain, he did not compete internationally until 2004, when he won the bronze medal in the Olympic Games. In 2005, he became European indoor champion, and in the 2005 World Championships, he finished fourth with 8.24, one centimetre short of the bronze medal.

Achievements

External links

Yahoo Sports
Picture of Joan Lino Martínez
Picture of Joan Lino Martínez

References

1978 births
Living people
Spanish male long jumpers
Spanish people of Cuban descent
Cuban male long jumpers
Athletes (track and field) at the 2004 Summer Olympics
Olympic athletes of Spain
Olympic bronze medalists in athletics (track and field)
Central American and Caribbean Games bronze medalists for Cuba
Competitors at the 1998 Central American and Caribbean Games
Olympic bronze medalists for Spain
Medalists at the 2004 Summer Olympics
Central American and Caribbean Games medalists in athletics